Max Defourny (born 9 October 1998) is a Belgian-born professional racing driver based in Luxembourg, currently competing in Formula Renault 2.0.

Career

Karting
Born in Liège, Defourny began karting in 2009 at the age of eleven and took his first karting title the following year.

Formula 4 Championships
Defourny graduated to single-seaters in 2014, partaking in nine races of the French F4 Championship as a guest driver and three rounds of the Italian F4 Championship with Cram Motorsport, finishing 20th in the overall standings.

Formula Renault 2.0
In 2015, Defourny graduated to the Formula Renault 2.0 series with the ART Junior Team, taking three victories and fourth place in Formula Renault 2.0 NEC.

Defourny remained with his previous outfit in 2016, following its rebadging as R-ace GP, and finished as vice-champion to Lando Norris in the Formula Renault 2.0 NEC and third in Eurocup Formula Renault 2.0.

Defourny stayed in R-ace GP in 2017. But he wasn't able to improve his championship position, finishing fourth behind his teammates Will Palmer and Robert Shwartzman. He took only one win at Circuit Paul Ricard at Le Castellet after disqualification of Shwartzman. He collected eleven podiums in 2017, three more than in 2016.

Formula V8 3.5
In November 2016, Defourny partook in post-season testing with Fortec Motorsports and AVF.

GP3 Series
Defourny drove at the post-season test at Yas Marina with ART Grand Prix and Arden International.

Racing record

Career summary

† As Defourny was a guest driver, he was ineligible for points.

Complete FIA Formula 3 European Championship results
(key) (Races in bold indicate pole position) (Races in italics indicate fastest lap)

References

External links
 
 

1998 births
Living people
Belgian racing drivers
French F4 Championship drivers
Italian F4 Championship drivers
Formula Renault 2.0 Alps drivers
Formula Renault 2.0 NEC drivers
Formula Renault Eurocup drivers
Sportspeople from Liège
FIA Formula 3 European Championship drivers
MP Motorsport drivers
Koiranen GP drivers
Auto Sport Academy drivers
Cram Competition drivers
Walter Lechner Racing drivers
R-ace GP drivers
Van Amersfoort Racing drivers
BRDC British Formula 3 Championship drivers
MRF Challenge Formula 2000 Championship drivers
ART Grand Prix drivers
Strakka Racing drivers